The James L. Gordon Integrated School (Paaralang Integral ng James L. Gordon), commonly known as "James L.", "JLGIS", and "James Gordon", is a public integrated School located at Foster St., New Kababae, Olongapo City, Zambales, Philippines.

History
Founded in the year 1952, James L. Gordon Integrated School, formerly known as Kababae Elementary School, James L. Gordon Memorial School (Pang-alaalang Paaralan ng James L. Gordon), is a comprehensive government school located at Foster St., New Kababae, Olongapo City, Zambales province of the Philippines. In 2000, another establishment was built in JLGIS. Due to adding of secondary education in the said school, the schools division office decided to renamed James L. Gordon Memorial School to James L. Gordon Integrated School. The High School Department was named James L. Gordon Integrated School-Olongapo City National High School Annex; it was added for the expansion of secondary education in Olongapo City. The school was a legacy by Amelia Gordon.

The JLGIS Hymn 

With voices proud and sweet, We all hail
J-L-G-I-S, in gratitude and joyous praise,
For JLGIS, beloved alma mater of our youthful days

My childhood's early dreams are closely linked with thee
Sweet are  the days of childhood
With friends we love and care
Your banner waving to the sky in blue and white
Thru all years will loyal be

Chorus

Long live JLGIS
Beloved Alma Mater
Alma mater dear we pledge
To glorify your noble name
We march together hand in hand
We sing together at your call

We are proud thee JLGIS
Thy mission is to develop the youth
In wisdom and ideas for truth
To be trained for life
And find their place in the world
Where everyone is an achiever

REPEAT CHORUS

JLGIS Beloved 
School of vision through the years
Do help us see the future
We all hail and we revere
Thy name forever
JLGIS ever faithful we all adore

Curriculum
K to 12 Basic Education Curriculum (K-12)

K+12 Education Cycle is a proposed program to overhaul the basic and secondary education curriculum. During the cycle, there will be four years of junior high school and two years of senior high school.

The following are the coordinators:

Maritess M. Million (Grade 7)  
Mrs./Mr.  (Grade 8)  
Mrs./Mr.  (Grade 9)  
Yvette H. Roque (Grade 10)

Open High School Program (OHSP)

|The Open High School Program aims to retain in school potential dropouts and encourage out-of-school youth of high school age (12-16) to return to school.

Coordinator:Proponent: Franklin P. Uy

Special Education Development (SPED)

The program provides activities for students who are visually impaired, hearing impaired, mentally retarded, autistic or orthopedically handicapped and fast learners.

Coordinator: Gamaliel R. Paz Jr.

BP-OSA 

BP-OSA is a novel alternative learning system that provides out-of-school adult high school education through certification. This under the Continuing Education Program-Accreditation and Equivalency (A&E) System of Bureau of Alternative Learning System (BALS).

Coordinator: Franklin P. Uy

Student life
The learning environment of JLGIS are exposed to different extracurricular activities such as student organizations, school competition, training's and seminars, division activities.

Extracurricular activities 
JLGIS actively participates annually to different contests like Schools Press Conferences, Science Fairs, Essay Writing Contest, Speech Choir Competitions, and other events sponsored by other schools, government agencies/units and non-government organizations.

Clubs and organization
Students can join the following organizations:
 Supreme Student Government (SSG) - JLGIS HS Student Council
 Supreme Pupil Government (SPG) - JLGIS ES Student Council
 Youth for Environment in Schools - Organization (YES-O)
 Performing Arts Club
 Filipino Club
 Mathematics Club
 Science Club
 TLE Club
 Araling Panglipunan Club
 M.A.P.E.H. Club
 Values Education Club
 Citizenship Advancement Training (C.A.T)
 Boys Scout and Girls Scout Of The Philippines

Teachers 
The following are the incumbent department heads of the James L. Gordon Integrated School - High School Department:

References

Schools in Olongapo
Educational institutions established in 1952
High schools in Zambales
1952 establishments in the Philippines